Albert II, Count of Hoya (1526 – 18 March 1563) was the ruling Count of Hoya from 1545 until his death.

Life 
Albert was the oldest son of Count Jobst II and his wife, Anna of Gleichen.  After his father died in 1545, he initially ruled jointly with his brothers Eric V and Otto VIII.  In 1553, his brother stepped down and Albert ruled alone.

In 1561, he married Catherine of Oldenburg.  This marriage remained childless.

Albert II died in 1563.  Hoya was inherited by Eric V, and when he, too, died childless, by Otto VIII.  The House of Hoya died out when Otto died in 1582.  Catherine survived them all, and died in 1620.

References 
 Heinrich Gade: Historisch-geographisch-statistische Beschreibung der Grafschaften Hoya und Diepholz, Nienburg, 1901
 Wilhelm Hodenberg (ed.): Hoyer Urkundenbuch, Hannover, 1848–1856
 Bernd Ulrich Hucker: Die Grafen von Hoya, Hoya, 1993
 Museum Nienburg: Die Grafschaften Bruchhausen, Diepholz, Hoya und Wölpe, Nienburg, 2000

Counts of Hoya
1526 births
1563 deaths
16th-century German people